The following is a list of the 98 stations in the Vienna U-Bahn metro system in Vienna, Austria.


Legend
Boldface: Terminus station

List

Future stations

Closed stations

References

External links 
 

Vienna
Transport in Vienna
Vienna U-Bahn